Ian Malone Hamilton (13 December 1906 – 29 August 1992) was a first-class cricketer who played twice for New Zealand in the years before New Zealand played Test cricket.

Cricket career
Hamilton attended Christ's College, Christchurch, where he was a prominent cricketer. He made his first-class debut in the 1926-27 Plunket Shield, playing one match for Canterbury as a middle-order batsman. He opened the innings in 1927-28, scoring 175 runs at an average of 29.16 with a top score of 77. He also made 69 for Canterbury against the touring Australian team. He was selected to play for New Zealand in both matches against Australia at the end of the season.

In the first match against Australia in Auckland, Hamilton batted at number three and scored a bright 40, including a six off Don Blackie, in the drawn match. In the second match in Dunedin, a low-scoring affair, he batted at number six, making 12 and 4, and New Zealand lost by seven wickets.

He played on for Canterbury with moderate success until 1932-33. In the first match in 1930-31 he scored 40 and 80, his highest score, against Auckland. He also played for South Canterbury in the Hawke Cup.

References

External links
Ian Hamilton at CricketArchive
Ian Hamilton at Cricinfo

1906 births
1992 deaths
People educated at Christ's College, Christchurch
New Zealand cricketers
Pre-1930 New Zealand representative cricketers
Canterbury cricketers
Cricketers from Christchurch